Benítez (meaning "son of Benito") is a surname of Spanish origin. It is thought to have originated in Asturias, in the north of Spain.

Geographical distribution
As of 2014, 23.6% of all known bearers of the surname Benítez were residents of Paraguay (1:37), 19.2% of Argentina (1:266), 16.3% of Mexico (1:910), 7.2% of Colombia (1:793), 6.4% of Spain (1:864), 4.5% of the United States (1:9,485), 3.6% of Venezuela (1:1,009), 3.4% of Honduras (1:306), 3.4% of the Philippines (1:3,520), 3.3% of Cuba (1:422), 2.4% of El Salvador (1:312) and 1.3% of Ecuador (1:1,424).

In Spain, the frequency of the surname was higher than national average (1:864) in the following autonomous communities:
 1. Ceuta (1:305)
 2. Andalusia (1:322)
 3. Canary Islands (1:350)
 4. Extremadura (1:378)

In Paraguay, the frequency of the surname was higher than national average (1:37) in the following departments:
 1. Caazapá (1:22)
 2. Guairá (1:25)
 3. Itapúa (1:28)
 4. Caaguazú (1:33)
 5. Canindeyú (1:33)
 6. Misiones (1:34)
 7. San Pedro (1:35)
 8. Alto Paraguay (1:35)
 9. Amambay (1:35)
 10. Alto Paraná (1:36)

Argentina
 Andrea Benítez (tennis) (born 1986), Argentine professional tennis player.
 Jorge José Benítez (born 1950), Argentine professional football player and coach.
 Leandro Benítez (born 1981), Argentine professional football player.
 Jonathan Benítez (born 1991), Argentine football player.
 Javier Benítez (born 1976), Argentine former athlete.
 Oliver Benítez (born 1991), Argentine professional football player.
 Walter Benítez (born 1993), Argentine professional football player.

Colombia
 Hernando Urriago Benítez (born 1974), Colombian poet and essayist.

Cuba
 Antonio Benítez-Rojo (1931–2005), Cuban-American professor.

Dominican Republic
 Armando Benítez (1972–), Dominican professional baseball player.

Ecuador
 Christian Benítez (also known as Chucho Benítez) (1986–2013), Ecuadorian professional football player.

Mexico
 Elsa Benítez (born 1977), Mexican supermodel.
 Erika Benítez, Mexican astronomer

Paraguay
 Arsenio Benítez (born 1971), Paraguayan professional football player.
 Mario Abdo Benítez (born 1971), Paraguayan politician and served of president of Paraguay.
 Delfín Benítez Cáceres (1910–2004), Paraguayan professional football player.
 Gustavo Benítez (born 1953), Paraguayan professional football player.
 José de La Cruz Benítez (born 1952), Paraguayan professional football player.
 Miguel Ángel Benítez (born 1970), Paraguayan professional football player.
 Pedro Benítez (footballer, born 1981), Paraguayan professional football player.
 Pedro Benítez

Philippines
 Albee Benitez, Filipino businessman and politician
 Daniel Zildjian Benitez, Filipino musician
 Paz Márquez-Benítez (1894–1983), Filipina short-story writer.

Puerto Rico
 Alejandrina Benítez de Gautier (1819–1879), Puerto Rican poet.
 Eddie Benitez (born 1962), Puerto Rican jazz musician.
 Félix Benítez (1886–1975), Puerto Rican architect of the Normandie Hotel in San Juan, Puerto Rico.
 Jaime Benítez (1908–2001), Puerto Rican author, academic, and politician.
 José Benítez (1848–1880), Puerto Rican poet of the Romanticism Era.
 Lucecita Benítez (Luz Esther Benítez) (born 1942), Puerto Rican singer.
 María Benítez (1783–1873), Puerto Rican poet and playwright.

Spain
 El Cordobés (Manuel Benítez Pérez) (born 1936), Spanish matador.
 Dani Benítez (born 1987), Spanish professional football player.
 Antonio Benítez (1951-2014), Spanish footballer.
 Juan Manuel Benitez, reporter and host of NY1 Noticias, a 24-hour local news Spanish-language station in New York City.
 Rafael Benítez (born 1960), Spanish professional football player and manager.

United States
 Gio Benitez, journalist.
 Jazmin Benitez, American professional wrestler known by her ring names Mercedes Martinez and Retaliation
 Joe Benitez (born 1971), American comic book artist.
 John Benitez (better known as Jellybean Benitez) (born 1957), American musician, DJ, and music producer.
 Wilfred Benítez (born 1958), American world champion professional boxer.

Uruguay
 Ademar Benítez (born 1956), Uruguayan former football striker.
 Otto Benítez, Uruguayan chess master

Venezuela
 Héctor Benítez (1918–2011), Venezuelan professional baseball player.

See also
 Hector Benitez (disambiguation) 
 Casas de Benítez, municipality in Cuenca, Castile-La Mancha, Spain.
 Comodoro Arturo Merino Benítez International Airport serving Santiago, Chile.
 United States v. Dominguez Benitez, 2004 US Supreme Court decision on the Federal Rules of Criminal Procedure.

References

Spanish-language surnames
Patronymic surnames
Surnames from given names